The Andalite Chronicles is a science-fiction novel and is the first companion book to the Animorphs series, written by K. A. Applegate. Within the timeline of the series, this book takes place before the first book in the series, The Invasion. The book was published in November 1997 and was followed the next year by the second companion book in the Chronicles series, The Hork-Bajir Chronicles. Before its wide release, however, the story was offered in the form of 3 separate volumes to school book clubs, which some considered a "typically savvy" marketing move.

Plot summary
The story takes place before and leading up to the events in The Invasion. It is narrated by Elfangor-Sirinial-Shamtul, or, as he is later known, Prince Elfangor, of the alien race known as Andalite. It begins with him uploading his memory into the computer before facing Visser Three at the abandoned construction site. The rest of the book is then a flashback of Elfangor's personal history, beginning with him as an aristh, a warrior in training, and ending with him at the construction site.

In 1976, Elfangor and his fellow aristh Arbron (aboard the dome ship StarSword) rescue two humans from the Skrit Na: Loren (no last name given) and Hedrick Chapman. They are assigned to return them to Earth under the leadership of a disgraced War-Prince, Alloran-Semitur-Corrass. However, upon realizing the Skrit Na are in possession of the mythical Time Matrix, they are forced to go after it. They find out that the Skrit Na are taking the Time Matrix to the Taxxon homeworld. Arbron becomes trapped as a Taxxon, and Elfangor becomes responsible for Alloran's infestation when Sub-Visser Seven (Esplin 9466) tricked him. Eventually, Elfangor, Alloran, the Yeerk controlling him (Esplin 9466), and the humans fall into a black hole. They are forced to use the Time Matrix to escape, which takes them to a fragmented universe created from Elfangor, Loren, and Esplin's (now Visser Thirty-Two) memories. Elfangor and Loren are able to escape to Earth in Loren's own time - although she has aged by several years due to the effect of the Time Matrix - where he permanently morphs into a human and stays in that form. He marries Loren sometime later, but just before she gives birth to Tobias, the Ellimist repairs Elfangor's "timeline". Elfangor finds himself in the middle of a battle between his old ship and the Yeerks. The Yeerk ship is being commanded by Visser Thirty-Two, now Visser Three. Elfangor rams the Yeerk ship, almost killing himself, and saves his fellow Andalites. After this, he is considered a hero.

The story returns to the construction site after Elfangor crashes back on Earth. It is here that he encounters his son Tobias and his four friends. Elfangor breaks the Andalite law and gives the five teenagers the ability to morph. As he dies, he expresses hope for the future.

Morphs

References

Animorphs books
1997 science fiction novels
Novels set on fictional planets
Fiction set in 1976
Fiction portraying humans as aliens
Novels about extraterrestrial life
Novels about time travel
Alien abduction in novels
Novels first published in serial form
Prequel novels